Marsha Ann "Marnie" Johnson Luknic (July 30, 1943 – August 22, 1992) was an American politician and businesswoman.

Born in Minneapolis, Minnesota, Luknic went to St. Olaf College and University of Colorado Boulder. Luknic and her husband, Otto, owned an antique shop in Faribault, Minnesota. Together they had two children: Stephanie and Matthew. Johnson served on the Faribault Planning Commission and was a member of the Rice County Historical Society. From 1979 to 1982, during the 71st and 72nd legislative sessions, Luknic served in the Minnesota House of Representatives and was a Republican. Luknic died from a brain hemorrhage in a hospital in Mason City, Iowa.

Notes

1943 births
1992 deaths
People from Faribault, Minnesota
Politicians from Minneapolis
University of Colorado Boulder alumni
St. Olaf College alumni
Businesspeople from Minneapolis
Women state legislators in Minnesota
Republican Party members of the Minnesota House of Representatives
20th-century American women politicians
20th-century American politicians
20th-century American businesspeople